The Huangdi Bashiyi Nanjing, often referred to simply as the Nan Jing, is one of the classics of traditional Chinese medicine (TCM).  

The Nan Jing was compiled in China during the first century C.E., the Nan Jing is so named because its 81 chapters seek to clarify enigmatic statements made in the Huangdi Neijing and is used extensively for study and reference in Japanese acupuncture and traditional Japanese medicine (TJM).

References

Chinese medical texts
Health and wellness books